Ruiner is the third studio album by American rapper Nothing,Nowhere. The album was released on April 13, 2018 through Fueled by Ramen.

Track listing

References

External links 
  
 Ruiner at Fueled By Ramen

2018 albums
Nothing,Nowhere albums
Fueled by Ramen albums